Hamlin is an unincorporated community in Audubon County, Iowa, United States.

History
 
Hamlin was laid out in 1872. It was named for Nathaniel Hamlin, a pioneer settler.

Hamlin's population was 14, in 1902.

See also
T-Bone Trail

References

Unincorporated communities in Audubon County, Iowa
1872 establishments in Iowa
Populated places established in 1872
Unincorporated communities in Iowa